The Auzoue is a  long river in the Gers and Lot-et-Garonne départements, southwestern France. Its source is at Bassoues. It flows generally north. It is a right tributary of the Gélise into which it flows at Mézin.

Départements and communes along its course
This list is ordered from source to mouth: 
Gers: Bassoues, Peyrusse-Grande, Cazaux-d'Anglès, Lupiac, Belmont, Castillon-Debats, Préneron, Vic-Fezensac, Lannepax, Courrensan, Gondrin, Lagraulet-du-Gers, Montréal, Fourcès 
Lot-et-Garonne: Lannes, Mézin

References

Rivers of France
Rivers of Gers
Rivers of Lot-et-Garonne
Rivers of Nouvelle-Aquitaine
Rivers of Occitania (administrative region)